The following teams and players took part in the women's volleyball tournament at the 1984 Summer Olympics, in Los Angeles.

Rosters

Vera Mossa
 Fernanda Silva
 Mônica da Silva
 Isabel Salgado
 Heloísa Roese
 Regina Uchoa
 Jacqueline Silva
 Ana Richa
 Sandra Lima
 Eliani da Costa
 Luiza Machado
 Ida Alvares
Head coach
 Enio Silva

Diane Ratnik
 Suzi Smith
 Tracy Mills
 Joyce Gamborg
 Audrey Vandervelden
 Monica Hitchcock
 Karen Fraser
 Rachel Beliveau
 Lise Martin
 Caroline Côté
 Barb Broen-Ouelette
 Josée Lebel
Head coach
 Lorne Swaula

Lang Ping
 Liang Yan
 Zhu Ling
 Hou Yuzhu
 Zhou Xiaolan
 Yang Xilan
 Su Huijuan
 Jiang Ying
 Li Yanjun
 Yang Xiaojun
 Zheng Meizhu
 Zhang Rongfang (c)
Head coach
 Yuan Weimin

Yumi Egami
 Kimie Morita
 Yuko Mitsuya
 Miyoko Hirose
 Kyoko Ishida
 Yoko Kagabu
 Norie Hiro
 Kayoko Sugiyama
 Sachiko Otani
 Keiko Miyajima
 Emiko Odaka
 Kumi Nakada
Head coach
 Shigeo Yamada

Carmen Pimentel
 Ana Chaparro
 Rosa García
 Sonia Heredia
 Gaby Pérez
 María del Risco
 Cecilia Tait
 Luisa Cervera
 Denisse Fajardo
 Miriam Gallardo
 Gina Torrealva
 Natalia Málaga
Head coach
 Park Man-Bok

Lee Eun-Kyung
 Lee Un-im
 Jin Chun-Mae
 Lee Yeong-seon
 Kim Jeong-sun
 Jae Sook-Ja
 Han Gyeong-ae
 Lee Myeong-hui
 Kim Ok-sun
 Park Mi-hui
 Im Hye-suk
 Yun Jeong-hye
Head coach
 Lee Chang-ho

Paula Weishoff
 Susan Woodstra (C)
 Rita Crockett
 Laurie Flachmeier
 Carolyn Becker
 Flo Hyman
 Rose Magers
 Julie Vollertsen
 Debbie Green-Vargas
 Kimberly Ruddins
 Jeanne Beauprey
 Linda Chisholm
Head coach
 Arie Selinger

Ruth Holzhausen
 Birgitta Rühmer
 Gudrun Witte
 Beate Bühler
 Regina Vossen
 Sigrid Terstegge
 Andrea Sauvigny
 Renate Riek
 Marina Staden
 Almut Kemperdick
 Terry Place-Brandel
 Ute Hankers
Head coach
 Andrzej Niemczyk

References

1984